The Journal of Circadian Rhythms is a peer-reviewed open access scientific journal covering circadian and nycthemeral (daily) rhythms in living organisms, including processes associated with photoperiodism and daily torpor. It was established in 2003 and originally published by BioMed Central. Since 2015 it is published by Ubiquity Press. The editor-in-chief is Roberto Refinetti (Boise State University).

Abstracting and indexing 
The journal is abstracted and indexed in:

External links

Notes 

Biology journals
English-language journals
Creative Commons Attribution-licensed journals
Ubiquity Press academic journals
Publications established in 2003
Online-only journals